Highway 11B is the designation for ten business routes of Highway 11 in the Canadian province of Ontario. All but one was the original route of Highway 11 through the town or city that it served, and was subsequently given the 11B designation when a newer bypass route was constructed to reduce traffic pressure on the urban street network. Seven of the nine sections of Highway 11B have now been decommissioned by the Ministry of Transportation, with the exception of the Atikokan route and the southernmost section of the former Tri-Town route between Cobalt and Highway 11.

Holland Landing 

Highway 11B through Holland Landing was created in 1958 when Highway 11 realigned to a new bypass, with Highway 11B assuming the former alignment along Yonge Street through Holland Landing. The province transferred Highway 11B to the Regional Municipality of York in 1981 and the route is now known as York Regional Road 83.

Orillia 

Highway 11B in Orillia was created in 1959 when Highway 11 was realigned to the Orillia bypass, which had opened in 1954. Highway 11B followed Memorial Avenue, Colborne Street, West Street, Coldwater Road, Front Street, Neywash Street, and Laclie Street through downtown Orillia. Over the years, as Orillia expanded its city limits, sections of Highway 11B were transferred from provincial to city jurisdiction. In 1981, the route was redesignated as unsigned Highway 7183, which remained until 1998 when jurisdiction was transferred to the City of Orillia, with exception of a small southern section in Simcoe County which became Simcoe County Road 49.

Gravenhurst 

Highway 11B in Gravenhurst was created in 1948 when Highway 11 was realigned to the first Gravenhurst bypass (Bethune Drive), and followed Muskoka Road and Winewood Avenue through downtown Gravenhurst. In 1970, Highway 11 was moved to the second Gravenhurst bypass and Highway 11B was moved to Bethune Drive. Highway 11B was decommissioned in 1972, with the section south of Bay Street becoming part of Highway 169 (present-day Muskoka District Road 169) and Muskoka District Road 41.

Huntsville 

Highway 11B in Huntsville was created in 1959 when Highway 11 was realigned to the Huntsville bypass. Highway 11B followed Main Street through downtown Huntsville until 1972 when it was decommissioned and became Muskoka District Road 3.

Powassan 

Highway 11B in Powassan was created in 1956 when Highway 11 was realigned to the Powassan bypass. Highway 11B followed Main Street through downtown Huntsville it was decommissioned in 1962.

North Bay 

Highway 11B in North Bay was created in 1958, when the former route of Highway 11 through downtown North Bay was given a new route number. Following the completion of the North Bay Bypass in 1953, both the old route through downtown and North Bay Bypasses were posted as Highway 11, leading to some confusion amongst motorists. Highway 11B followed Lakeshore Drive, Main Street, and Algonquin Avenue, with it sharing a concurrency with Highway 17B between Fisher Street and Algonquin Avenue. In the mid 1970s, Highway 11B in downtown North Bay was rerouted to parallel one-way streets, with northbound traffic following McIntyre Street and southbound traffic following Oak Street. Highway 11B in North Bay was decommissioned in 1998.

Cobalt–Temiskaming Shores 

Highway 11B followed Miller Avenue, Cobalt Street, Grandview Avenue, Silver Street and Lang Street through Cobalt; King Street, Rorke Avenue, Main Street, Ferguson Avenue and Lakeshore Road through North Cobalt and Haileybury; and Lakeshore Road, Paget Street, Whitewood Avenue and Armstrong Street through New Liskeard. During the 1997–1998 downloading, the majority of Highway 11B was transferred to local municipalities. The remaining sections of Highway 11B runs between Highway 11 in Coleman Township to Cobalt town limits, and between Cobalt and Temiskaming Shores city limits. The northernmost  was retained but renumbered as Highway 65 in 2003.

In 1987, a section of the Cobalt route of Highway 11B collapsed into an abandoned mine, cutting off the town of Cobalt.

Major intersections

Matheson–Porquis Junction 

Highway 11B between Matheson and Porquis Junction was created in 1958 when Highway 11 realigned. Highway 11B went from the Highway 11/Highway 101 junction in Matheson, through the communities of Monteith and Val Gagne, to the Highway 11/Highway 67 junction in Porquis Junction. Highway 11B was renumbered as Secondary Highway 626 in 1961, which in turn was transferred to the Municipal Township of Black River-Matheson and the Town of Iroquois Falls in 1974.

Thunder Bay 

Highway 11B between Port Arthur and Fort William (which later amalgamated to become Thunder Bay) was created in 1968 when the Highway 11/17 concurrency was realigned to follow the Thunder Bay Expressway, and was cosigned with Highway 17B for its entire length. Highway 11B/17B started at Hodder Avenue and travelled south to Cumberland Street, where it continued southwesterly along the shore of Thunder Bay. It continued on Water Street to Bay Street, where it turned west on Bay Street to Algoma Street, where it turned south-southwest and followed Algoma Street, Memorial Avenue, and May Street to Arthur Street. It travelled west on Authur Street, past Kingsway (formerly Highway 61B), before rejoining Highway 11/17 as well as Highway 61.

Atikokan 

Highway 11B in Atikokan was created in 1962 when Highway 11 was extended to Fort Frances; the extension was constructed south of Atikokan and bypassed the community, resulting in the bypassed section becoming Highway 11B. Highway 11B in Atikokan is unique in that is a spur route and does not form a loop that reconnects to Highway 11. Despite the larger number of business routes that were transferred to local municipalities in 1997–98, Highway 11B in Atikokan is one of the few that remained untouched and is still part of the provincial highway system.

Major intersections

References 

011B
011B
Former segments of the Trans-Canada Highway